Voluptuous Panic is an American indie rock duo founded in 2013 by Gretchen DeVault, who is the primary singer and songwriter in the prominent indie-pop group The Icicles, and music journalist/author Brian J. Bowe. The duo’s music has been described as hypnotic, textured and dreamy, mixing elements of shoegaze, dream pop and trip-hop.

Bowe and DeVault met in 2008 when he wrote a cover story chronicling the Icicles' success in the indie pop world -- including placements in international commercials for Target Corporation and Motorola -- for the alumni magazine of their shared alma mater, Grand Valley State University. The pair stayed in touch and began collaborating. In 2010, they recorded Bowe's score for the film "The Death of an Imam", which was nominated for a regional Emmy and won the Best of Festival Award at the Broadcast Education Association's Festival of Media Arts.

Following the release of the Icicles’ dark “Renegade Parade” album, DeVault found she needed an outlet for the more melancholic side of her writing—particularly after her struggle with postpartum depression. During that period, Bowe was living in France and teaching at CELSA Paris. He began sharing song ideas with the Michigan-based DeVault remotely. This process of recording separately is one the group retains. In an interview, Bowe called the remote recording process one of Voluptuous Panic’s defining characteristics. “It’s a slow conversation, but it allows us to access deep emotional spaces that might not be possible in a room with a lot of other people,” he said.

The group adopted the name Voluptuous Panic in 2013, after Bowe came upon the phrase in the book "Frame Analysis" by sociologist Erving Goffman while conducting Ph.D. research. 

Starting in 2014, Voluptuous Panic began releasing a series of singles. The group earned notice as “one of the most stylish guitar bands to emerge on the shoegaze scene”  and has drawn frequent comparisons to Slowdive, which the group cites as an influence.
In 2015, they collaborated with French electronic musician Human Koala on the song “Zyva,” which combined psychedelic guitars with modular synthesizers and drum machine beats.

In 2016, Voluptuous Panic released an EP titled “Une Sorte de Panique Voluptueuse,” which was a remixed collection of its earliest demos. The group also appeared on the compilation “Big Day Coming,” a tribute to the band Yo La Tengo.

Voluptuous Panic rarely performs live. For a few shows in 2013, the group was augmented by a rock rhythm section that included bassist Niel Carlson and Icicles drummer Zane DeVault; in 2014, they performed with Icicles keyboardist Joleen Rumsey.

Discography

’’Fall Away’’ (2014)
’’Polar Vortex’’ (2014)
’’Zyva’’ (2015)
’’Petit Ciel Bleu’’ (2015)
’’Midnight Chrome’’(2015)
’’Trapped in Amber’’ (2015)
’’Une Sorte de Panique Voluptueuse’’ (2016)
Appears on ’’Big Day Coming, A Tribute to Yo La Tengo’’ (2016)
’’Take Me Under’’ (2017)
’’Broken’’ (2019)
’’Heavy Hearts’’ (2019)
’’Lake Dream’’ (2019)
’’Paris Rêve’’ (2020)
’’Sun Is Shining’’ (2020)

References

External links
 
 Voluptuous Panic on Bandcamp
 Midnight Chrome with Voluptuous Panic - An Interview

Musical groups from Grand Rapids, Michigan
American indie rock groups
2013 establishments in Michigan